Kerns is a neighborhood in the inner Northeast and Southeast sections of Portland, Oregon.  It borders the Lloyd District and Sullivan's Gulch on the north, Laurelhurst on the east, Buckman and Sunnyside on the south, and (across the Willamette River) Old Town Chinatown on the west.

The Kerns neighborhood dates back to the 1850s when the area’s first homesteader, William Kerns, wielded axes and saws to clear his 320-acre Donation Land Claim.  Kerns earned a living making and selling wood shingles and shakes. By 1855, Kerns was elected by the local school district as its school director, and he led the effort to purchase land for Washington High School.

Kerns has a healthy mixture of commercial buildings, condos, rental housing, and single family residences.  It's streets are characterized by many trees and comfortable sidewalks.  Sandy Boulevard, which follows a path that was used by Native Americans to travel from the Willamette River to the Sandy River, is a main thoroughfare in the neighborhood.  Transportation to and from the neighborhood is easy by foot, bike, bus or car.

According to the 2014 Kerns Neighborhood Street Tree Inventory, the neighborhood has 3,140 trees representing 91 different types.  Parks in Kerns include Everett Community Garden (1988), Buckman Field (1920), and Oregon Park (1940).

Portland Public Schools include Benson Polytechnic High School and da Vinci Arts Middle School. Pacific Crest Community School also resides within the neighborhood.

28th Avenue's popular restaurant scene brings a great deal of business into the neighborhood. Tabla, Pambiche Cocina and Repostería Cubana, and Navarre are just a few of the notable restaurants which operate on this street. Screen Door, a restaurant which has been featured on the Food Channel and consistently has long waits for a table, is located on East Burnside and 23rd in the Kerns neighborhood. 

The neighborhood hosts the art-deco Laurelhurst Theater, the Bond Organ Builders, which makes and refurbishes real pipe organs, and the Oregon Children's Theatre, which houses its Box Office, YP Studio Theater & Classes at 1939 NE Sandy Blvd.

For many years, Sunshine Dairy operated in the Kerns neighborhood on NE 21st Avenue and Oregon Streets. Sunshine Dairy ran its sales and marketing out of the Fire Alarm Dispatch (FAD)  building, which, in 1928 was constructed solely for use as a communications headquarters at NE 21st and Pacific Avenue.  In May 2018, Sunshine Dairy filed for Chapter 11 bankruptcy, closing their historic location after 83 years of dairy production.

Starting in the 1960s, Pepsi Beverages Company operated a bottling and distribution facility on a 4.7-acre Northeast Portland tract on 2505 Northeast Pacific Street, but this location closed in the mid 2010's and was purchased by a developer in 2017.  Coca Cola still operates a bottling and distribution facility on 2710 NE Davis St and prior to this use the building was used as a school.

References

External links
 Guide to Kerns Neighborhood (PortlandNeighborhood.com)
 Kerns Street Tree Inventory Report
 Kerns beats strongly as booming heart of Portland’s east side
 PepsiCo Tract Planned for Major Development
 2018 Sunset Times Article on Kerns
 A Perfect Day in Kerns

 
Neighborhoods in Portland, Oregon
Northeast Portland, Oregon
Southeast Portland, Oregon